Scott Marble (1847 – April 5, 1919) was a playwright who wrote the 1896 stage melodrama The Great Train Robbery which in 1903 was made as a film of the same name that later would be regarded as a classic movie Western. His other plays include Tennessee's Pardner (1894), The Sidewalks of New York (1895), The Cotton Spinner (1896), The Heart of the Klondike (1897), Have You Seen Smith? (1898), On Land and Sea (1898), and Daughters of the Poor (1899). With the composer Richard Stahl he wrote the book for the romantic opera Said Pascha which originally was produced at the Tivoli Opera House in San Francisco in 1888.

Marble was born in Pennsylvania in 1847. He moved to the Chicago area circa 1878, and worked there as an actor in the 1880s. He and his wife, actress Grace Marble, had four children. He died in New York City, on April 5, 1919.

References

Further reading
The Oxford Companion to American Theatre. New York: Oxford University Press, 1984.

External links

1845 births
1919 deaths
American dramatists and playwrights
Writers from New York City